The Ermenek Dam is a double-curvature concrete arch dam located on the Göksu River in Karaman Province, Turkey. The development was backed by the Turkish State Hydraulic Works. Completed in 2009, the primary purpose of the dam is to support its 300 MW power station.

Ermenek Consortium

Ermenek Dam was constructed by the Ermenek Consortium that was specially created for this project. Member companies of the Consortium are BM Muhendislik ve Insaat A.S. (pilot and leader of the civil group), Alpine Bau GmbH, Pöyry Energy GmbH (engineer), Alstom Austria AG (financial coordinator and leader of the E&M group), VA TECH HYDRO GmbH & Co. and Voith Hydro GmbH & Co.

The Consortium was also responsible for provision of full foreign financing for the project, under terms agreeable to the Turkish Treasury.

Erik Regulator and HEPP

The Ermenek Project also comprises a second power facility named Erik Regulator and HEPP, which is located on the Eric Creek that flows into Ermenek River. Erik Regulator takes water from 815,0m elevation, transmits it through the Erik Pressure Tunnel into the Erik Power Cavern. The power cavern has an installed power capacity of 2*4,455 MW (total 8,91 MW), thereby raising the Ermenek project total to 308,91 MW. Water discharged from the Erik Power Cavern feeds into the Ermenek Dam system at the Ermenek Valve Chamber.

See also

List of dams and reservoirs in Turkey

References

DSI, State Hydraulic Works (Turkey), Retrieved December 16, 2009
Ermenek Dam Official Website, Retrieved October 20, 2010

Dams in Karaman Province
Hydroelectric power stations in Turkey
Arch dams
Dams completed in 2009